Field Marshal Sir Archibald Armar Montgomery-Massingberd,  (6 December 1871 – 13 October 1947), known as Archibald Armar Montgomery until October 1926, was a senior British Army officer who served as Chief of the Imperial General Staff (CIGS) from 1933 to 1936. He served in the Second Boer War and in the First World War, and later was the driving force behind the formation of a permanent "Mobile Division", the fore-runner of the 1st Armoured Division.

Military career

His father was Hugh de Fellenberg Montgomery, a landowner and Ulster Unionist politician, and his mother was Mary Sophia Juliana May Montgomery (née Maude). The young Montgomery was educated at Charterhouse and at the Royal Military Academy, Woolwich, and then was commissioned a second lieutenant into the Royal Field Artillery on 4 November 1891. He was posted to a field battery in India in 1892 and became a lieutenant on 4 November 1894. He served with the Royal Field Artillery during the Second Boer War and took part in the Battle of Magersfontein and the Battle of Paardeberg. Having been promoted to captain on 8 March 1900, he was mentioned in despatches on 4 September 1901.

After the war Montgomery served as a battery captain at Bulford Camp before attending Staff College, Camberley from 1905 to 1906. He became a staff captain at the Inspectorate of Horse and Field Artillery in 1907 and a staff officer at Aldershot Command in 1908. Promoted to major on 5 June 1909, he was appointed a general staff officer at the Indian Staff College at Quetta in India on 9 February 1912.

At the outbreak of the First World War in July 1914 Montgomery was appointed a general staff officer to the British Expeditionary Force (BEF) in France. He was appointed chief of staff at IV Corps in France in October 1914. Promoted to lieutenant colonel on 16 May 1915, he became chief of staff of the Fourth Army of the BEF in February 1916, a role which, according to General Sir Douglas Haig, Commander-in-Chief (C-in-C) of the BEF, from the planning for the Battle of the Somme in 1916 he carried out with "great ability and success". Promoted to the substantive rank of major-general on 1 January 1917, he was appointed a Companion of the Order of the Bath for his services in the field on 1 January 1918. He was effectively deputy commander of the Fourth Army (deputising for General Sir Henry Rawlinson) in the final months of the war and played an important role in the success of the Battle of Amiens. He was appointed a Knight Commander of the Order of St Michael and St George for his services in connection with military operations in France and Flanders on 1 January 1919 and was also awarded the American Distinguished Service Medal by the President of the United States on 12 July 1919. The medal's citation reads:

Montgomery was appointed chief of staff of the British Army of the Rhine (BAOR) following the war and then Deputy Chief of the General Staff in India on 27 March 1920 before becoming General Officer Commanding (GOC) of the 53rd (Welsh) Division on 3 March 1922. He became GOC 1st Division at Aldershot on 4 June 1923 and, having been advanced to Knight Commander of the Order of the Bath in the New Year Honours 1925, he was promoted to lieutenant-general on 16 March 1926. Following a two-year break on half-pay, he became GOC-in-C Southern Command on 17 June 1928. Promoted to full general on 1 October 1930, he was appointed Adjutant-General to the Forces on 1 March 1931 and made aide-de-camp general to the King on 3 March 1931.

He was appointed Chief of the Imperial General Staff (CIGS) in February 1933. Among his main achievements at this time was the mechanising of the cavalry: indeed he was the driving force behind the formation of a permanent "Mobile Division". Despite this, according to Williamson and Millett, he was a great obstacle to innovation of mechanized forces and suppressed the analysis of the British Army's performance in the First World War initiated by his predecessor, Lord Milne. Advanced to Knight Grand Cross of the Order of the Bath in the King's Birthday Honours 1934, he was made a field marshal on 7 June 1935. Following the death of King George V he took part in the funeral procession in January 1936 and then retired in March 1936.

He was also Colonel Commandant of the Royal Regiment of Artillery from 19 November 1927, Colonel Commandant of the Royal Tank Corps from 7 December 1934, Colonel Commandant of the 20th Burma Rifles from 5 April 1935, Honorary Colonel of the 46th (Lincolnshire Regiment) Anti-Aircraft Battalion, Royal Engineers, from 17 March 1937 and Colonel Commandant of the Royal Malta Artillery from 11 May 1937.

In retirement he became deputy lieutenant and then Vice-Lieutenant of the County of Lincoln. During the Second World War the Air Ministry attempted to build an airfield at Great Steeping in Lincolnshire that would have extended into Sir Archibald's wife's traditional family estate, necessitating the demolition of the magnificent mansion of Gunby Hall. He personally appealed to King George VI and the Air Ministry relented, redrawing the plans that resulted in the resiting of the new RAF Spilsby two miles further south. During the Second World War he also took charge of organizing and recruiting the Home Guard in Lincolnshire for nine months. His major passion in life was horsemanship. He died at the age of 75 at his home, Gunby Hall, on 13 October 1947 and was buried at St. Peter's Church in Gunby.

Family
In 1896 Archibald Montgomery married Diana Langton Massingberd. They had no children. In October 1926, his wife inherited Massingberd family estates, and he changed his name by Royal Licence to add her name to his own. Thus, references to him as "Montgomery-Massingberd" during the First World War are anachronistic. The journalist and genealogist Hugh Massingberd was a great-nephew of both the Field Marshal and, independently, the Field Marshal's wife, and in 1963 he and his father also adopted the Massingberd name to inherit the same estates.

References

Bibliography

External links
 

 

|-

|-
 

|-

1871 births
1947 deaths
Burials in Lincolnshire
People from Fivemiletown
Graduates of the Royal Military Academy, Woolwich
People educated at Charterhouse School
British field marshals
British Army personnel of the Second Boer War
British Army generals of World War I
Knights Grand Cross of the Order of the Bath
Knights Commander of the Order of St Michael and St George
Knights Grand Cross of the Royal Victorian Order
Royal Field Artillery officers
Chiefs of the Imperial General Staff
Recipients of the Distinguished Service Medal (US Army)
Graduates of the Staff College, Camberley
People from Spilsby
Foreign recipients of the Distinguished Service Medal (United States)
British Home Guard officers
Military personnel from County Tyrone